Sreeja S versus Commissioner of Police   (2018) is case where Kerala High Court held that separating the adults in a consensual relationship will be violation of the Constitutional right.

See also 

 LGBT rights in India
 Adhila Nasarin v. State Commissioner of Police (2022)
 Chinmayee Jena v. State of Odisha (2020)
 Navtej Singh Johar v. Union of India (2018)

References 

High Courts of India cases
Indian LGBT rights case law
LGBT rights in India
2018 in LGBT history
2018 in India